Auli Station is a railway station located in Auli in Nes, Norway on the Kongsvinger Line. The station was built in 1974 as part of the Kongsvinger Line. The station is served hourly, with extra rush hour departures, by the Oslo Commuter Rail line R14 operated by Vy.

External links
 Norwegian National Rail Administration's page on Auli

Railway stations in Nes, Akershus
Railway stations on the Kongsvinger Line
Railway stations opened in 1974
1974 establishments in Norway